The 1984 Montana Grizzlies football team represented the University of Montana in the 1984 NCAA Division I-AA football season as a member of the Big Sky Conference (Big Sky). The Grizzlies were led by fifth-year head coach Larry Donovan, played their home games at Dornblaser Field and finished the season with a record of two wins, eight losses and one tie (2–8–1, 0–7 Big Sky).

Schedule

References

External links
Montana Grizzlies football – 1984 media guide

Montana
Montana Grizzlies football seasons
Montana Grizzlies football